The 8th Venice International Film Festival was held from 23 August to 15 September 1947. Screenwriter Vinicio Marinucci was appointed as the President of the Jury. Formally, it still was not the Golden Lion to designate the highest honor of the event. The prize was known as the Grand International Prize of Venice, which was awarded to The Strike, directed by Karel Steklý.

Jury
Main Competition (Venezia 8)
Vinicio Marinucci, Italian screenwriter and journalist (Jury President)
Hugo Mauerhofer, Swiss film scholar
Antonín Martin Brousil, Czechoslovak film critic and historian
Jacques Ibert, French composer
Fabrizio Malipiero, Danish entrepreneur
Cirly Ray, British journalist
William Karol, Mexican film producer
Dimitri Jeriomin, Soviet writer
Jeanne Contini, American journalist

Official selection

In Competition
The following films were selected for the main international competition:

Highlighted title indicates Grand International Prize winner.

Awards

Official selection
The following official awards were presented at the 8th edition:

In Competition
Grand International Prize of Venice: The Strike by Karel Steklý
International Award for Best Actress: Anna Magnani for Angelina
International Award for Best Actor: Pierre Fresnay for Monsieur Vincent

References

External links

1947 film festivals
1947 in Italy
Venice Film Festival
Film
August 1947 events in Europe
September 1947 events in Europe